Sun Zheng'ao (Chinese: 孙正傲; pinyin: Sūn Zhèng'ào; born 8 March 1994 in Qingdao) is a Chinese footballer who currently plays as a defender for Zhejiang Pro.

Club career
Sun joined Hangzhou Greentown youth team system from Qingdao Hainiu Football School when he was a teenager. He started his professional football career in 2011 when he was sent to China League Two club Wenzhou Provenza (Hangzhou Greentown youth team) for one year. He played 10 times in the 2011 league season. Sun was promoted to Hangzhou Greentown's first team squad by Takeshi Okada in 2012. On 26 June 2012, he made his debut in the third round of 2012 Chinese FA Cup which Hangzhou beat Shanghai Dongya 3–0. In 2012 season, he mainly played in the reserve league and made just two appearances in the FA Cup. In July 2014, Sun moved to China League One side Beijing BIT on a six-month loan deal. In February 2015, Sun was loaned to League One side Shenzhen FC for one season. He made his Super League debut on 13 August 2016 in a 3–0 home victory against Henan Jianye. Unfortunately he would be part of the squad that was relegated at the end of the season. He would remain with the club and go on to establish himself as a regular member within the team as they renamed themselves Zhejiang Professional. He would then play a vital part as the club gained promotion to the top tier at the end of the 2021 campaign.

International career
Sun played for Chinese under-17 national team in the 2010 AFC U-16 Championship. He played two matches in the group stage and was sent off in the second match against United Arab Emirates. In October 2011, he was called up into China U-20 squad for 2012 AFC U-19 Championship qualification. Although China U-20 qualified into the 2012 AFC U-19 Championship, he was sent off in the last match against Australia with a flagrant foul, which team manager Jan Olde Riekerink considered it as a disgraceful action and said he would never call up Sun for the U-20s squad in the future. However, Riekerink took back his words and Sun received another called up for the 2012 AFC U-19 Championship. He played two matches in the championship as China were eliminated in the group stage after losing all three matches.

Career statistics 
Statistics accurate as of match played 31 January 2023.

References

External links
 

 

1994 births
Living people
Footballers from Qingdao
Chinese footballers
Zhejiang Professional F.C. players
Shenzhen F.C. players
Chinese Super League players
China League One players
China League Two players
Association football defenders